A squirrel bridge is a construction (similar to a wildlife crossing) which enables small animals, especially squirrels and martens, to safely cross busy roadways. The bridges are a measure for wildlife management and natural habitat preservation, and serve the functions of both animal welfare and accident prevention. The Nutty Narrows Bridge in Longview, Washington, built in 1963, is regarded as the first of its kind. The city has since built six other bridges for squirrels.

Costs to construct squirrel bridges vary significantly, depending on construction. Simple rope bridge constructions, such as those in Brecht, Belgium, have cost only about 250 euros, while the bridge built in The Hague in 2013 took half a year to construct and cost 150,000–200,000 euros.

List of squirrel bridges 
The following bridges protect the red squirrel, common in Europe, or the North American gray squirrel (either of which may be hunted as an invasive species depending on the continent).

Similar concepts for other species

See also
 Bat bridge
 Toad tunnel

References

Further reading 
 Why did the squirrel cross the road? Science and technology news, University of Leeds, 2008
 Squirrel Bridges and Road Warning Signs
 Brendan D. Taylor, Ross L. Goldingay: Can Road-Crossing Structures Improve Population Viability of an Urban Gliding Mammal?

Articles containing video clips
Bridges
Conservation projects
Natural resource management